"Chuck Versus the Cougars" is the fourth episode of the second season of Chuck. It originally aired on October 20, 2008. Chuck Bartowski learns more about Sarah Walker's past when they run into her old high school nemesis Heather Chandler (Nicole Richie). Sarah's teenage insecurities come to surface and she tries to avoid Heather at all costs. Chuck, on the other hand, does everything he can to hear more about Sarah's hidden life. When Heather's nerdy husband Mark Ratner (Ben Savage) turns out to be a key player in a new mission, the agents must attend Sarah's high school reunion to prevent the sale of potentially dangerous super-bomber plans – all the action ends with the ultimate cat fight. Meanwhile, Big Mike leaves town for the weekend and the Buy More's new assistant manager Lester Patel decides to implement a new sales policy.

Plot

Main plot
At the Burbank Buy More, Sarah Walker notices an old schoolmate, Heather Chandler (Nicole Richie). She hides Chuck Bartowski in Castle, ordering him not to leave or touch anything. However, Chuck cannot resist admiring the advanced DU-97 computer. He accesses it, learning that there are a number of cameras around his home and the Buy More. He then spies on Sarah, who is known under a different identity to Heather. Chuck learns that Sarah was known as Jenny Burton at high school.

Chuck then flashes on Heather's geeky husband Mark Ratner (Ben Savage), who is an engineer in development of a new F-22 fighter aircraft. General Beckman (Bonita Friedericy) orders Chuck and Sarah to go on a double date with the Ratners to learn more about Mark. Sarah objects, stating that her identity has been compromised, but Beckman insists that the previous identity is crucial to the mission.

At the restaurant they are at with the Ratners, Sarah "accidentally" spills wine on Chuck's lap to stop him from digging into her past. Chuck goes to the washroom to clean up, only to find Mark being threatened by two members of the Russian Mafia. The Russians get suspicious and, after with Mark was locked in a washroom stall, try to force Chuck to talk. Luckily, John Casey, disguised as a waiter, arrives and incapacitates the Russians. As Casey leaves, Mark peeks out and assumes Chuck has knocked out the Russians. Chuck accidentally reveals that the men were mafia, leading Mark to suspect that Chuck is CIA. Chuck decides to "play the part" and passes himself off as "Charles Carmichael".

The next day, Mark is covertly taken to Castle, where Casey attempts to interrogate him, promising witness protection in exchange for the location of his next meet with the Russian. After Mark initially refuses to speak to anyone but "Carmichael", Casey convinces him by telling him that Chuck is known as "Mad Dog". Mark then reveals that the mafia threatened him and his wife, and he only communicates with them by text messaging. Suddenly, Mark receives a text asking to meeting again the next night, which happens to be the night of his, Sarah's, and Heather's class reunion.

Upon arrival at James Buchanan High School, home of the eponymous "Cougars", Chuck flashes on a tattoo. Chuck presumes the tattoo's wearer, old school bully Dick Duffy (Michael Weaver), to be Mark's contact; Mark himself finds it obvious. Sarah promises to alert Casey, who is disguised as the event's disc jockey. When Sarah meets Duffy, she knocks him out for attempting to flirt with her. She and Casey learn that Duffy is actually a small-time crook.

Mark's real contacts arrive and Heather is revealed to be working with the mafia. She informs them that Chuck being a spy, having overheard a conversation between him and Mark. Upon seeing the Russians, Chuck urges Mark to run, while uses the spotlight to point out the two men to Sarah and Casey. Sarah notices Heather leaving the gym and follows. As they fight, Heather reveals that she is extorting Mark's F-22 plans for an unnamed buyer, and she never really loved him. Sarah eventually defeats Heather by knocking a cougar statue on her head. Meanwhile, Casey stops the Russians from killing Mark, although Mark presumes once again that Chuck saved his life. Afterwards, Sarah walks into the gymnasium battered, barefoot and bloody, only to be crowned reunion queen.

Chuck and Sarah
Hostility rises between Chuck and Sarah when Chuck asks about her past, but she insists on keeping it secret. Sarah relives her painful past in flashbacks, revealing that she was a homely high school student teased and bullied by her peers.

Chuck later arrives at Sarah's apartment for a mission debrief, and she makes it clear that she will not answer questions about her past, throwing his pencil into a portrait of themselves and intimidating Chuck into submission. Chuck again tries digging into Sarah's past during their double date with the Ratners, but Sarah spills wine onto his lap.

Chuck later brings Sarah a dress for her high school reunion. However, Sarah is reluctant to go, as high school was a tough time for her. Nonetheless, Chuck persuades her to go. This proves worthwhile, as Sarah not only conquers her high school nemesis, but she is also crowned reunion queen.

As Chuck later enjoys a lunch with Sarah, he wonders why she changed in high school (see Flashbacks).

Buy More
At the Buy More, Big Mike goes on a fishing trip, leaving Lester Patel in charge. This gives Lester the opportunity to implement a new sales policy, allowing customers to name their own price, which could potentially mean giving out free products. Although Chuck and Morgan Grimes guess that the policy will end badly, they allow him to implement it to see the fun in its failure.

Chuck later returns to find Lester panicking in Big Mike's office. Lester reveals that, out of the merchandise they sold, they failed expected cash demands to pay for the items. Morgan then asks the staff for ideas on how to obtain $3,700 within one night. Jeff Barnes suggests burning the store down for the insurance. However, Chuck unintentionally suggests throwing a keg party, to which everyone agrees.

However, the party goes out of control and ultimately results in Big Mike's prized marlin being broken. Lester tries ending the party, but the guests refuse to leave. When they finally leave, the Buy More employees quickly clean up the mess before Big Mike returns, and Morgan barely patches up the marlin. Big Mike congratulates Lester on his success as assistant manager, but Lester decides to resign. After he leaves, the marlin's snout falls off.

Flashbacks
The episode's main plot is augmented with flashbacks depicting Sarah's origins. The first shows a young Sarah Walker, under the alias Jenny Burton, returning home to witness her father being arrested by the ATF. She runs to a tree, where her father had buried a box full of cash in case of emergencies.

In the present day, Sarah blows off steam on a punching bag at her apartment. A flashback shows her high school life following her father's arrest in 1998 San Diego California. After stuffing a young Mark into a locker, Dick Duffy, the school bully, offers to be the "man around the house" for Jenny.

Another flashback shows that after Jenny found her father's stash of cash, she is surprised by the appearance of Langston Graham (Tony Todd). After she throws a knife and just misses him, Graham admires her throw. He lists several aliases she has assumed across the country, including "Katie O'Donnell" in Wisconsin, "Rebecca Franko" in Cleveland, and even "Jenny Burton." He claims to know the name on her birth certificate, but Jenny tells him to get to the point before he reveals it. Graham explains to her that her father failed in scamming dangerous people, and he saved her father's life by arresting him. He offers to help save her too, so Jenny holds out to be handcuffed, presuming that he wants to arrest her. However, Graham  offers to recruit her into the CIA under a new alias: Sarah Walker.

Production

Continuity
 Jeff suggests burning down the Buy More to obtain the insurance, a recurring theme in the series.
 Chandler extorts F-22 plans for members of the Russian mafia. This is the first known reference to Alexei Volkoff, the Russian criminal whom Chandler reveals the plans where earmarked for in "Chuck Versus the Cubic Z".
 Director Graham is the first person outside of Sarah's family confirmed to know her real name.

Flashes
 Chuck flashes on Mark, learning that he is an engineer in the development of a new F-22.
 Chuck flashes on members of the Russian mafia.
 Chuck flashes on Duffy's tattoo.

Cultural references
This episode maintains the series' tendency to reference popular culture. Ratner is believed to be named after Brian Backer's character from Fast Times at Ridgemont High, and Chandler after Kim Walker's character from the film Heathers. Ratner, Chandler, and Sarah's alma mater shares its name with the Sweathogs' high school in Welcome Back, Kotter.  Walker's high school alias shares her name with 1980s R&B performer Jenny Burton whose songs were prominently featured in 1984's Beat Street.

Critical response
"Chuck Versus the Cougars" received generally positive reviews from critics, and Richie's performance was praised. Eric Goldman of IGN gave this episode a score of 9 out of 10, praising Richie's and Strahovski's performances, writing, "This was a highly entertaining episode, which shed some very interesting new light on Sarah, while still making sure there were plenty of questions left to answer. Kudos to Yvonne Strahovski for her portrayal of the young, braces wearing outcast Sarah. It was a funny and effective change, and while the hair and makeup people did great work making her look so different, Strahovski also gave it her all by showing a much more shy, closed off version of the girl we know. Yvonne Strahovski looks the way she does – bad hair, a bad complexion and braces wouldn't make her still not be a pretty girl underneath all of that. But the way the young Sarah was portrayed, it came off as believable that she would be a loner, simply because of how different and reserved her demeanor was... It all led up to one hell of a fight between Sarah and Heather at the reunion, which not only was done to the tune of "Smack My Bitch Up", but also eventually had the women mercilessly beating up on each other in the showers, with the water of course blasting down on them. It's amazing to think how clunky and bad the circumstances I just described could be if done by creators who didn't have the style and wit that Chuck's do. "

Steve Heisler of The A.V. Club gave the episode a B+, writing "... What I imagined to be a gimmicky outing was actually a pretty fun, well-rounded episode, albeit slightly lacking the control of the last three."

The episode drew 6.872 million viewers.

References

External links
 

Cougars
2008 American television episodes